Ram Awadhesh Singh Yadav (June 18, 1937 – July 20, 2020) was an Indian politician, and a renowned Social Justice Leader of India. He was a Member Bihar Vidhan Sabha (1969–71), Member of Parliament in the Lok Sabha (1977–1979), and in the Rajya Sabha (1986–1992).  He was a well-known socialist leader and a strong follower of Dr. Ram Manohar Lohia. His long struggle led to the formation of well-known "Mandal Commission", i.e. he is also known as "God-Father of Mandal Commission". He is also known as "Periar of the North". He was Nominated as Member, National Commission for Backward Classes (June 2007).

References

1937 births
2020 deaths
India MPs 1977–1979
Lok Sabha members from Bihar
Rajya Sabha members from Bihar
Bharatiya Lok Dal politicians
Lok Dal politicians
Samyukta Socialist Party politicians
Samajwadi Party politicians
Janata Dal (Secular) politicians